Francisco Gabriel Guerrero (born 23 August 1977, in Buenos Aires) is an Argentine former football player who played as striker.

Career
Guerrero advanced from the U-20 team to Independiente's first team in 1994. In 2001 he was transferred to Switzerland and joined FC Zurich under head coach Georges Bregy. He played with them on occasion, but not regularly. After two and a half seasons he was loaned out.

On 12 February 2004 he signed a half-year loan contract with FC Basel. The club were looking for replacements for the two Swiss internationals Marco Streller and Hakan Yakin who both transferred to VfB Stuttgart. Guerrero joined Basel's first team during their 2003–04 season under head coach Christian Gross. Guerrero was the fourth Argentinian in the team, joining Christian Giménez, Matías Delgado and Julio Hernán Rossi. Gross let Guerrero sit on the bench in every one of the last 18 matches of the season and used him as substitute on 13 occasions, usually as replacement for one of his three countrymen. Guerrero played his domestic league debut for the club in the away game in the Stadion Neufeld on 15 February 2004 as Basel won 1–0 against Young Boys. He scored his first and only goal with the team in the home game in the St. Jakob-Park on 28 February. It was the last goal of the game as Basel won 6–0 against Xamax. Despite the away win to the start of the second half of the season, the team was not as steadfast as it had been before the winter break. Basel ended the season undefeated at home, but were beaten three times away, nevertheless they won the championship with 13 points advantage over their nearest rivals Young Boys.

Following this loan period Guerrero re-joined FC Zurich, now under head coach Lucien Favre. At the end of the 2004–05 season FCZ won the 2004–05 Swiss Cup.

In the summer of 2005 Guerrero returned to Argentina and joined Estudiantes de La Plata, but not being able to gain a place in the starting eleven, he spent six months on loan to Huracán de Tres Arroyos. Shortly after his return to Estudiantes Guerrero resolved his contract with the club and returned to Switzerland. He joined YF Juventus for six months. On 30 June 2007 it was announced that he had joined Aarau. He played for them during two seasons. He finally joined APEP in 2009 before he retired from his football career.

International career 
He won 1995 FIFA World Youth Championship.

Honours
Basel
 Swiss Super League: 2003–04

FC Zürich
 Swiss Cup: 2004–05

References

Sources
 Die ersten 125 Jahre. Publisher: Josef Zindel im Friedrich Reinhardt Verlag, Basel. 
 Verein "Basler Fussballarchiv" Homepage

External links
Statistics at Guardian Stats Centre
FC Aarau profile
Swiss Football League profile

1977 births
Living people
Argentine footballers
Argentine expatriate footballers
Club Atlético Independiente footballers
FC Zürich players
FC Basel players
SC Young Fellows Juventus players
Estudiantes de La Plata footballers
FC Aarau players
APEP FC players
Argentine Primera División players
Swiss Super League players
Cypriot First Division players
Footballers from Buenos Aires
Association football forwards
Expatriate footballers in Cyprus
Expatriate footballers in Switzerland
Argentina youth international footballers
Argentina under-20 international footballers